Víctor González (or Victor Gonzalez) may refer to:

Victor Gonzalez (director), American television director
Víctor González (athlete) (born 1987), Cuban sprinter
Victor González (baseball) (born 1995), professional baseball player
Víctor González (actor) (born 1973), Mexican actor
Víctor González (cyclist) (born 1957), Uruguayan cyclist
Víctor González Chang (born 1994), Chilean footballer
Víctor González Torres (born 1947), Mexican businessman-cum-politician
Víctor Hugo González (born 1974), Colombian road racing cyclist
Victor Gonzalez Jr. (born 1975), Puerto Rican racing driver
Víctor Rafael González (born 1959), Mexican politician